is a Japanese former actress and martial artist. She gained prominence in Hong Kong and became popular in the Philippines as Cynthia Luster. Due to Filipinos' interest in Jackie Chan, she became Chan's pseudo female equivalent.

Biography
Born  in Nishi-ku, Fukuoka, Japan, to a Japanese businessman and fashion designer and a Chinese woman, Oshima began studying Gōjū-ryū Seigokan karate at Ennouji Dojo in junior high school.
She was one of Japan's brightest female martial artists during the 1980s and a leading figure in the babes and bullets fad of Hong Kong action cinema. She played the role of "Farrah Cat" in Bioman, which aired not only in Japan originally but also worldwide. She is best known to Western audiences as Yomi in Riki-Oh: The Story of Ricky. After her Hong Kong career dried up, she embarked on a new career in the Philippines in the 1990s with the stage name Cynthia Luster.

Oshima now resides in Fukuoka, Japan, where she has promoted tourism in the city. She is commonly known to Western audiences as the actress in the Marlboro Lite commercials (in the late 1990s).

Selected filmography

Television
Space Sheriff Gavan (1983, TV series)
Kagaku Sentai Dynaman (1983, Ep. 28) as Doll Assassin
Choudenshi Bioman (1984–1985, TV series) as Farrah Cat
Space Sheriff Shaider (1984, TV series)
Sukeban Deka II (1986, ep. 1)

Film

Lover's Tear (1992) as Police officer
Full Contact (1992) (新龙争虎斗) as Mrs. Wang
The Big Deal (1992) as Sim-Lan
The Direct Line (1992) as Mok Yu Xia, CID Madam
Nv xiao feng yun: Xie jiao ru qin (1992)
Fatal Chase (1992) as Cynthia
Beauty Investigator (1992) as The Hitwoman
Jin san jiao qun ying hui (1992) as Bullet
Hard to Kill (1992)
Mission of Justice (1992)
Patio (1992)
The Story of the Gun (1992)
Win Them All (1992)
Zong heng tian xia (1993) (uncredited)
Angel the Kickboxer (1993)
Lethal Panther (1993) as Jane Matsuko/Shoko (international version)
Serious Shock! Yes Madam! (1993) as Coco
The Avenging Quartet (1993) as Oshima
Project S (1993, cameo) as Terrorist
Ghost's Love (1993)
Love to Kill (1993)
Angel of Vengeance (1993)
Kakambal ko sa tapang (1993) as Michelle
Angel Terminators II (also known as The Best of Lady Kickboxers, 1993) as Bullet
1/3 qing ren (1993) as Lin Ching-Hsia
Xing Qi Gong Zhi Tan Bi (1993)
Once Upon a Time in Manila (1994, Cynthia Luster's first Filipino movie) as Lt. Cynthia Wang
Yue gui zhi lang (1994)
Pintsik (1994) as May Leng
His Way, Her Way, Their Ways! (1994)
Hong tian mi ling (1994) as Inspector Cynthia Lee Lai-Nga/Lisa Li
Deadly Target (1994)
Drugs Fighters (1995) as Yi Chian
Kinkyu yobidashi - Emâjenshî kôru (1995)
Ultracop 2000 (1995) as Trishia Marks
1/3 Lover (1995)
Emergency Call '95 (1995, cameo)
Hubungan jenayah (1995) as Heung Lan
Power Connection (1995)
Guardian Angel (1996)
Tiger Angels (1997)
Tapang sa Tapang (1997) Jane Nakamoto & Alana sim (沈诗芳-小慧欣) as Jane Nakamoto
Super Cops (1997) as Interpol Agent Yukari
Challenge (1997)
Vengeance Is Mine (1997)
Gold Rush (1998)
The Golden Nightmare (1998) as Nikki
Leopard Hunting (1998) as Chieko
To Kiss Is Fatal (1998) as Diana Pama Aller
Digital Warriors (1999) as Jean Chung
Double Sin (1999)
It Takes a Thief (1999)
Hakata Movie: Chinchiromai (2000) as Fay Ian 
Xtreme Warriors (2001)
Ashita wa kitto (2001) as Girl in grape field
Legendary Amazons (2011) as Zou Lanying (final film role)

See also

Citations

General sources

External links

HK cinemagic entry
Information at brns.com
AllCinema Movie Database Entry 

1963 births
Japanese actresses
Japanese female karateka
Japanese people of Chinese descent
Living people
People from Fukuoka
Gōjū-ryū practitioners